Alvar Johannes Alev (born 29 September 1993) is an Estonian cross-country skier who competes internationally.

He represented his country at the 2022 Winter Olympics.

Cross-country skiing results
All results are sourced from the International Ski Federation (FIS).

Olympic Games

Distance reduced to 30 km due to weather conditions.

World Championships

World Cup

Season standings

References

External links

Estonian male cross-country skiers
1993 births
Living people
Olympic cross-country skiers of Estonia
Cross-country skiers at the 2022 Winter Olympics
People from Tori Parish
21st-century Estonian people